Oddesund is a strait in the Danish Limfjorden. The Oddesund Bridge spans the fjord connecting the mainland of Jutland with Thy. According to the Heimskringla, a battle took place in Oddasund between the Swedish king Jorund and a Norwegian pirate from Hålogaland.

The area is a popular for tourists and it offers recreational fishing opportunities.

Straits of Denmark
Limfjord